Yefrosinya Fedorova (also Euphrosyne, Afrosinya, Afrosina, Ofrosinya; 1699/1700 – 1748), was a Finnish-born Russian serf. She became the mistress of Alexei Petrovich, Tsarevich of Russia and fled with him on 26 September 1716. She was the property of Alexei's tutor, dyak , but had originally been a captive from Finland, then a Swedish province, and was thereby a Swedish citizen.

Background
Afrosina was born around 1700 or 1699. Her father was called Teuvo, or Feodore in Russian, Theodore in English. Her brother was called Jouni in Finnish, Ivan in Russian and John in English. Her name in Finnish was probably Eufrosyne, called Eufrosinya in Russian and Afrosina in English.  It is thought that she and her brother were prisoners of war. They were captured in the south of Finland, and sold into serfdom. The Russians fought Finland in what is called Great Wrath from 1714 for three years. It is likely she was captured shortly before being presented to Alexei.

Afrosina was described as being short and red haired. There were uncomplimentary descriptions of her as being tall with thick lips but these have been said to be false; eye witness descriptions contradict that. She was likely somewhat stout, considered very attractive at a period when many adults, including Alexei her lover, had tuberculosis.

Royal mistress
The relationship with Alexei began in 1714 or 1715. She was a present given to him by dyak Nikifor Vyazemsky who had been his first tutor. He was later his companion.

By that time he was already married to Charlotte Christine of Brunswick-Lüneburg. The dynastic marriage made him the brother in law of Charles VI, Holy Roman Emperor and Prince of Austria, who was married to Charlotte's older sister Elizabeth. The marriage to Alexei was unhappy. Charlotte did not like Russia and had been brought up in the court etiquette of Austria. She never learned Russian and retained her own religion. Alexei described her as pock marked and thin. He was not comfortable with her, nor were those who made him the center of opposition to his father Peter the Great.
His wife Charlotte bore Alexei a daughter, named Natalya after the beloved mother and sister of Peter the Great in 1714. She also had a son named Peter on 23 October 1715, later to be Peter II. She then died nine days later of childbirth fever. Charlotte gave the children to Peter the Great on her deathbed. She asked him to raise them, made her peace with God, and thanked Peter with tears. Then she asked that drugs not be given her as she wished to die.

During the childbirth of Natalya, Alexei was in Carlsbad on vacation, and on his return, Afrosina came with him. Afrosina met Alexei at the age of 15 or 16 and he immediately fell in love with her. Alexei had no mother beyond the age of six and he was in awe of his father, who found him lacking. Also the aristocracy of Russia at that time was very like the peasantry in culture and outlook. Most could not read, all were quite religious and most had little contact with women, including their wives.  European aristocracy already had an intimidating and intricate set of mores.
Afrosina lived with Alexei in his part of the house, after the birth of his daughter Natalya. She and her brother were part of the household of Alexei after that date.

Exile in Austria
Alexei, the son of Peter the Great, left Russia on 26 September 1716. He and his father radically disagreed. Alexei feared having an heir born of his second wife; his father would have him killed. There were rumours that he was to be ambushed or put on the front lines of the Navy, with instructions to the captain of his vessel to make sure he was put in harm's way. A friend of Peter the Great, Jacob Dolgorikis, told Alexei not to go to his father. In the meantime, Peter wrote to his son Alexei that he was to choose between being becoming a monk or being the next Tsar.

Alexei announced that he would join his father and he intended to go with Afrosina as far as Riga and then send her home. He borrowed money from Aleksandr Menshikov and others. Menshikov encouraged him to take Afrosina with him to the front. This was very odd, and supports the idea that an unpleasant surprise awaited him. However, instead of going north to join his father Peter the Great, Alexei left for Vienna going under the name of a Polish nobleman, Kokhansky.

Afrosina accompanied Alexei on his escape from Russia in September 1716, along with her brother Ivan and three servants. She dressed as his page during the escape. Alexei begged protection from his brother-in-law Charles VI, arriving at Vienna the night of November 10. Aid was offered because Charles VI thought Peter capable of murdering his heir, as he wrote his cousin, King George I of Great Britain, and because he hoped to have Alexei return to Russia as his puppet. The Emperor hid him, Afrosina, and her brother with three servants and many books in the castle of Ehrenberg. The staff was told that a high-ranking Hungarian or Pole was staying there, and no one was allowed to leave. But Alexei was discovered by two spies sent by Peter the Great after five months. The two bribed a clerk in the Imperial Chancery for the information. The Emperor Charles VI did not want to lose face by turning Alexei over to his father against his will and so sent the pair to Naples, an area he had recently acquired.

In the meantime Afrosina became visibly pregnant and the Vice Chancellor Schönborn wrote the little page was clearly female, and the mistress of Alexei. The spies of Peter tailed them as they left Ehrenberg and found them once again, this time in the Castle of St. Elmo in Naples. Peter Tolstoy at 72 was sent by Peter to bring them back. He began by enlisting the help of Duchess Christine Louise of Brunswick-Wolfenbüttel, mother of the dead Charlotte Christine. She was afraid her grandson Peter would be cut out of the line of succession if Alexei was cut out by his father. In this way the mother-in-law of Holy Roman Emperor Charles VI was enlisted to return Alexei to his father.

Alexei was then told that Afrosina would be taken from St. Elmo on the orders of the Emperor if they remained in his care. This was untrue; no such order existed. However Alexei, believing this, agreed to return to Russia, on condition that the two be allowed to marry and live on an estate far from the court and out of line for succession. Three days after he left, the Swedes were to offer him shelter and an army too, should he come under their protection. He never received the offer.

Return to Russia
When Alexei returned to Russia, he initially left Afrosina behind. She was to be cared for by her brother at Venice because she was pregnant. She had servants, and he sent her money, more servants and an Orthodox priest also. She wrote letters through a secretary. Her own hand was scrawling and childlike. She behaved as a tourist buying items and going on tours and he spared no effort or money for her entertainment. By April 14, 1718, he was desperate and falling on his knees before Catherine I after the Easter service, asked her to speed the arrival of Afrosina.

The next day Afrosina arrived in St. Petersburg to be arrested. She either gave birth in prison at the Fortress of Peter and Paul or at Riga en route.  The child was never heard from again. If the child died, was killed or simply placed with others remains a mystery. Alexei implicated many for helping him in his flight from Russia. Many who simply spoke sympathetically to him were punished for their opposition to his father Peter the Great. Tutors and priests, as well as noble friends and household servants were named and tortured. But Alexei said Afrosina only carried his boxes of letters.  She was in no way aware of their content.  She was not aware of any plan and said nothing in opposition to Peter the Great.

Afrosina was shown the instruments of torture upon arrival and knowing the situation to be hopeless produced letters from Alexei to various important persons enlisting their protection from Peter. She confided that Alexei said he would undo much of his fathers work including abandoning St. Petersburg and the military. Afrosina  signed a written statement against Alexei. She was made to confront Alexei in front of Peter.

Peter Tolstoy reported that Alexei loved Afrosina beyond expression. The confrontation led to the collapse of Alexei. She testified that Alexei had plans to overthrow Peter. She also testified that the Prince wanted to flee to Rome to the Pope, but she stopped him. What she said amounted to no more than general discontent. No plot was uncovered.

Later life
Tsar Peter freed Afrosina after the death of Alexei. According to Robert K. Massie, she lived in St. Petersburg, for thirty years after the death of Alexei on June 26, 1718. She was allowed to keep many of the possessions of Alexei and her possessions also. She eventually married an officer of the St. Petersburg Guards.

See also
 Lovisa von Burghausen
 Brigitta Scherzenfeldt
 Annika Svahn

References
 Abbott, Jacob, Peter I, Emperor of Russia, 1672-1725 Publisher: New York London, Harper & brothers, 1859
 Bain R. Nisbett. The First Romanovs.  London : Archibald Constable & Co. 1905
 Browning Oscar, Peter 1 emperor of Russia, London Hutchinson & Co, England 1898
 Bushkovitch, Paul, Peter the Great, Rowman and Littlefield Publishers inc, New York 2001
 Hughes, Lindsey Russia in the Age of Peter the Great, Yale University Press, 1998
 Massie, Robert K  Peter the Great, Random House, New Jersey 1991
 Henri Troyat, Peter the Great, E.P. Dutton, Boston, 1987
 Voltaire, History of the Russian Empire Under Peter the Great (Vol. I 1759; Vol. II 1763)
 Waliszewski, Kazimierz,  Peter the Great, London, Heinemann, 1898

Mistresses of Russian royalty
18th-century people from the Russian Empire
18th-century Finnish people
Swedish people of the Great Northern War
Russian serfs
Place of birth unknown
Place of death unknown
17th-century births
1748 deaths
18th-century slaves
Finnish emigrants to Russia
Finnish expatriates in Austria
Finnish expatriates in Italy
Finnish people imprisoned abroad
Immigrants to the Tsardom of Russia